The House of Grimaldi (also  ,) is the current reigning house of the Principality of Monaco. The house was founded in 1160 by Grimaldo Canella in Genoa and became the ruling house of Monaco when Francesco Grimaldi captured Monaco in 1297. The House of Grimaldi has produced every Prince of Monaco. During much of the Ancien Régime, the family resided in the French court, where from 1642 to 1715 they used the title of Duke of Valentinois.

The current head of the house is Albert II of Monaco, Sovereign Prince of Monaco, who is the son and successor of Prince Rainier III and the Princess consort Grace of Monaco, formerly known as Grace Kelly.

Beginnings in Genoa
The Grimaldis descend from Grimaldo, a Genoese consul who lived during the time of the early Crusades. He may have been a son of Otto Canella, an earlier consul of the Republic of Genoa. His numerous descendants led maritime expeditions throughout the Mediterranean, the Black Sea, and the North Sea. They quickly became one of the most powerful families of Genoa.

The Grimaldis feared that the head of a rival Genoese family could break the fragile balance of power in a coup and become lord of Genoa, as had happened in other Italian cities. They entered into a Guelphic alliance with the Fieschi family. In 1271, the Guelphs were banned from Genoa, and the Grimaldi took refuge in their castles in Liguria and Provence. They signed a treaty with Charles of Anjou, King of Sicily and Count of Provence to retake control of Genoa. In 1276, they accepted a peace under the auspices of the Pope, but the civil war continued. Not all the Grimaldis chose to return to Genoa and settled in their fiefdoms, where they could raise armies.

In 1299, the Grimaldis and their allies launched a few galleys to attack the port of Genoa before taking refuge on the Western Riviera. During the following years, the Grimaldis entered into different alliances that would allow them to return to power in Genoa. This time, it was the turn of their rivals, the Spinola family, to be exiled from the city. During this period, both the Guelphs and Ghibellines took and abandoned the castle of Monaco, which was ideally located to launch political and military operations against Genoa. Therefore, the tale of Francis Grimaldi and his faction – who took the castle of Monaco disguised as friars in 1297 – is largely anecdotal.

In the early 14th century, the Aragonese raided the shores of Provence and Liguria, challenging Genoa and King Robert of Provence. In 1353, the combined fleet of eighty Venetian and Aragonese galleys gathered in Sardinia to meet the fleet of sixty galleys under the command of Anthony Grimaldi. Only nineteen Genoese vessels survived the battle. Fearing an invasion, Genoa requested the protection of the Lord of Milan.

Several of the oldest feudal branches of the House of Grimaldi appeared during these conflicts, such as the branches of Antibes, Beuil, Nice, Puget, and Sicily. In 1395, the Grimaldis took advantage of the discords in Genoa to take possession of Monaco, which they then ruled as a condominium. This is the origin of today's principality.

As was customary in Genoa, the Grimaldis organised their family ties within a corporation called . In the political reform of 1528, the Grimaldi became one of the 28  of the Republic of Genoa, which included the Doria and Pallavicini families, and to which other families were formally invited to join. The House of Grimaldi provided several doges, cardinals, cabinet ministers, and military officers of historical note.

French influences

Provence became a part of the Kingdom of France from 1486, and occasionally the Grimaldi relied upon French support to preserve their independence from the Republic of Genoa and the Duchy of Savoy. In the process they married into the French nobility in the 1600s, inherited French estates, and often lived in Paris, latterly at the Hôtel Matignon, until the French Revolution of 1789. Monaco and the neighbouring County of Nice was taken by the revolutionary army in 1792, and were French-controlled until 1815. Nice passed back to the Kingdom of Sardinia in 1815; then it was ceded to France by the Treaty of Turin (1860). Monaco was re-established by the Congress of Vienna in 1815, with a brief Italian occupation in 1940–43.

Modern succession
By convention, sovereign European houses are male primogeniture. Therefore, since 1731, it has been determined genealogically that it was in fact the French noble House of Goyon-Matignon that ruled as Princes of Monaco until 1949.  However, one of the terms of James de Goyon de Matignon becoming Prince of Monaco jure uxoris was that he adopt the name and arms of Grimaldi so that the house would be preserved on the throne, and the right of succession was through his wife Louise-Hippolyte Grimaldi, who abdicated in her husband's favor. Similarly, when Charlotte Louvet was legitimised in 1911 and made successor to Monaco, her husband, Count Pierre de Polignac, adopted, as a condition of the marriage, the name and arms of Grimaldi, but from this moment all his direct descendants Grimaldi would also have the title of Counts of Polignac. In this way the "Grimaldi" name and arms were continued.

Until 2002, a treaty between Monaco and France stated that if the reigning Prince ever failed to leave dynastic offspring, then sovereignty over the Grimaldi realm would revert to France. The 2002 agreement modified this to expand the pool of potential heirs to dynastic collaterals of the reigning Prince (excluding adoptive heirs, hitherto allowed, e.g. Princess Charlotte and her descendants), guaranteeing Monegasque independence. Article I of Monaco's house law requires that the reigning Prince or Princess bear the surname of Grimaldi.

The coat of arms of the House of Grimaldi is simply described as fusily argent and gules, i.e., a red and white diamond pattern, with no further modifiers.

Main living members
 Albert II of Monaco, Sovereign Prince of Monaco, son and successor of Rainier III and Grace Kelly.
 Charlène de Monaco, Princess Consort of Monaco.
 Jacques, Hereditary Prince of Monaco, Marquis of Baux, Count of Polignac, son of Albert II and Charlène.
 Princess Gabriella, Countess of Carladès, Mademoiselle of Polignac, daughter of Albert II and Charlène.
 Caroline, Princess of Hanover, Mademoiselle of Polignac, older sister of Albert II and Stéphanie.
 Andrea Casiraghi, Charlotte Casiraghi, and Pierre Casiraghi, children of Caroline and her late husband, Stefano Casiraghi.
 Princess Alexandra of Hanover, daughter of Caroline and her present husband, Ernst August, Prince of Hanover.
 Princess Stéphanie of Monaco, Mademoiselle of Polignac, younger sister of Albert II and Caroline.
 Louis Robert Paul Ducruet, Pauline Grace Maguy Ducruet, and Camille Marie Kelly Gottlieb, children of Stéphanie.
 Christian Louis de Massy, cousin of Albert II. Married four times and with offspring.

Family tree

Select list of Grimaldis 

 
 Grimaldo Canella, consul of the Republic of Genoa, founder of this House
 Hubert Grimaldi, first to bear the Grimaldi patronymic name
 Luca Grimaldi, troubadour and podestà of Milan and Ventimiglia
 Rainier I, lord of Cagnes, admiral of France
 Charles I, lord of Monaco, Cagnes, and Menton
 Anthony, lord of Monaco, admiral of Genoa
 Luc and Marc Grimaldi of Antibes, lords of Menton, Cagnes, and Antibes
 Lamberto Grimaldi and Claudia of Monaco
 Augustin, archbishop
 Nicolas, prince of Salerno
 Louis I, prince of Monaco, ambassador of Louis IV
 Girolamo (died 1543). Created a Cardinal in 1527. He married Francisca Cattaneo of Genoese and had five children. After her death he entered holy orders. He was a Senator of Genoa.
 Domenico, Archbishop of Avignon and uncle of Girolamo Grimaldi-Cavalleroni (see below)
 Girolamo (1597–1683). Cardinal and Archbishop of Aix
 Elena Grimaldi, painted by Anthony van Dyck
 Girolamo (1674–1733). Created a Cardinal 1731
 Alexander, doge of Genoa
 John Baptist, doge of Genoa
 Peter Francis, doge of Genoa
 Honoré II, Prince of Monaco (1597–1662)
 Jacques François Leonor Grimaldi. Prince of Monaco and father of Honoré III, Prince of Monaco
 Nicola (1645–1717). Created cardinal deacon in the consistory of 17 May 1706
 Jerónimo Grimaldi, 1st Duke of Grimaldi (1710-1789)
 Louise-Hippolyte, Princess of Monaco - mother of Honoré III, Prince of Monaco
 Honoré III, Prince of Monaco (1720–1795)
 Honoré IV, Prince of Monaco (1758–1819)
 Honoré V, Prince of Monaco (1778–1841)
 Florestan I, Prince of Monaco (1785–1856)
 Charles III, Prince of Monaco (1818–1889)
 Albert I, Prince of Monaco (1848–1922)
 Louis II, Prince of Monaco (1870–1949)
 Princess Charlotte, Duchess of Valentinois (1898–1977)
 Prince Pierre, Count of Polignac (1895–1964)
 Rainier III, Prince of Monaco (1923–2005)
 Princess Antoinette, Baroness of Massy (1920–2011)
 Caroline Louise Marguerite Grimaldi (born 1957)
 Albert II, Prince of Monaco (born 1958)
 Stéphanie Marie Elisabeth Grimaldi (born 1965)
 Jacques, Hereditary Prince of Monaco (born 2014)
 Princess Gabriella, Countess of Carladès (born 2014)

See also
 Line of succession to the Monegasque throne
 Prince's Palace of Monaco
 Monegasque Princely Family
 House of Goyon de Matignon
 House of Polignac

References and further reading

 Edwards, Anne. The Grimaldis of Monaco. William Morrow, 1992.
 Maclaga, Michael and Louda, Jiri. LINES OF SUCCESSION; Heraldry of the Royal Families of Europe. MacDonald & Co., 1981; Little, Brown & Co., 1999; Time Warner Books, UK, 2002 
 Maurizio Ulino, L'Età Barocca dei Grimaldi di Monaco nel loro Marchesato di Campagna, Giannini editore, Napoli 2008.

External links
 Grimaldi family tree
 Grimaldi Family of Sicily
 

 
History of Monaco
Republic of Genoa families
Italian noble families
Roman Catholic families
Lists of Monegasque people
Monegasque families